Alajos Györgyi Giergl (1821 in Pest – 1863 in Pest) was a Hungarian painter. He is notable for his portraits and paintings in the Romanticism style.

References 

 

1821 births
1863 deaths
People from Pest, Hungary
19th-century Hungarian painters